Telečka (Serbian Cyrillic: Телечка, Hungarian: Bácsgyulafalva) is a village in Serbia. It is in the Sombor municipality, in the West Bačka District, Vojvodina province. The village has a Hungarian ethnic majority and its population is 2,084 people (2002 census). It is surrounded by a sandy region, also referred to as Telečka, or Telečka sands.

History
Settlement was built in 1883-1884 by Hungarian colonists. First census was conducted in 1890 and it recorded population of 2,479 inhabitants. Before the First World War this village was part of Bács-Bodrog County (Kingdom of Hungary, Austria-Hungary). Since 1918, it is part of the Kingdom of Serbs, Croats and Slovenes (later renamed to Yugoslavia). Today, the village has a Hungarian ethnic majority with more than 70% of the population.

Ethnic groups (2002 census)
Hungarians = 1,508 (72.36%)
Serbs = 429 (20.59%)
Romani = 37 (1.78%)
Yugoslavs = 23 (1.10%)
Croats = 13 (0.62%)
others.

Historical population

1961: 2,996
1971: 2,665
1981: 2,429
1991: 2,138

See also
List of places in Serbia
List of cities, towns and villages in Vojvodina

References
 Slobodan Ćurčić, Broj stanovnika Vojvodine, Novi Sad, 1996.

External links 

 www.soinfo.org
 http://bacsgyulafalva.5mp.eu

Places in Bačka
Sombor
West Bačka District